Nordcurrent is the largest Lithuanian video game development and publishing company headquartered in Vilnius, Lithuania. It has three development studios in Vilnius, Odesa, Dnipro (Ukraine). Nordcurrent develops and publishes casual and freemium games for smartphones, tablets and PC/Mac. The company has developed several super hits games, such as Cooking Fever, Murder in the Alps, Sniper Arena, Pocket Styler and Happy Clinic.

History 
Nordcurrent has been operating since 2002 when Ivolgamus, a company developing games for consoles, was established in Vilnius by two brothers Sergej and Michail Trofimov and Michail’s wife Victoria.

The company worked for a while as a developer in the console business, mostly known for cooperation with Activision. In 2007 they grew rapidly and achieved a great success with the Shrek and Barbie games, which was developed for Activision. In 2008 Nordcurrent started publishing independently to take advantage of the opportunities available on the global market. Since 2010, Nordcurrent has exclusively specialised in the development of freemium and casual games.

The first big hit created by the company was 101-in-1 Games for the iOS platform and it has reached top 5 games in as many as 75 countries. The game has already reached 20 million downloads (2014).

In August 2014, iOS game Cooking Fever was released. In February 2015, it was released for Android. In the first year Cooking Fever was downloaded by more than 50 million players. Now it has almost 400 million downloads and the number is still growing rapidly. Also in November 2015 Nordcurrent opened a new development studio in Warsaw, Poland.

One of company’s most popular game Sniper Arena was released in 2016 and has 50 million downloads worldwide.

In 2018, Nordcurrent acquired Odesa (Ukraine) game studio Blam! Games Studio which then was renamed to Nordcurrent Odesa. Also in October 2018, Nordcurrent released Murder in the Alps, which already has over 10 million downloads.

By the last three years Nordcurrent has released several new games – Airplane Chefs (2021), Pocket Styler (2021), Ocean’s Heart (2021) and Happy Clinic (2022).

Nordcurrent company continues to expand with the acquisition of RinGames, based in Dnipro, Ukraine. The acquired company has 28 employees and 10 years of experience in the computer games industry. RinGames was previously known as the strongest game graphics team in Ukraine.

The company is also a member of the Lithuanian Game Developers Association - an organisation of professional and amateur game developers in all fields.

Since 2002 Nordcurrent has developed more than 50 games that have attracted more than half a billion players worldwide.

Awards 
In 2015, Nordcurrent developed game Cooking Fever was awarded as the game of the year by LT Game Awards.

In 2017, Nordcurrent co-founders Victoria, Michail and Sergej Trofimov’s were awarded for their services to the Lithuanian games industry by the LT Game Awards.

In 2018, Norcurrent released game Murder in the Alps was awarded in the LT Game Awards as best game in several nominations: best sound design, best game for smart devices and the best game of the year.

In 2021, company’s game Airplane Chefs in LT Game Awards was nominated for best sound design and best game for smart devices categories.

Games published

References

External links
 

Companies based in Vilnius
Video game companies established in 2002
Information technology companies of Lithuania
Video game development companies
Video game companies of Lithuania
Lithuanian companies established in 2002